Chicago 1930 (also known as Chicago 1930: The Prohibition) is a 2003 video game developed by Spellbound Entertainment.

The game is based in the American city of Chicago in the 1930s, an era heavily associated with gangsters. The RPG style game allows players to choose to be the mafia, headed by Don Carmine Falcone, or a special unit of the police, headed by Edward Nash.

Gameplay

Plot

Development

Reception

References

External links 
 Chicago 1930  at Microïds

2003 video games
Microïds games
Organized crime video games
MacOS games
Windows games
Video games about police officers
Video games set in Chicago
Detective video games
Video games developed in Germany
Video games set in the 1930s
Spellbound Entertainment games
Single-player video games
Works about the American Mafia